Pope John XIX of Alexandria (Abba Youannis XIX), 113th Pope of Alexandria & Patriarch of the See of St. Mark.

A monk
He joined the Paromeos Monastery in the Nitrian Desert as a monk and was sent to Greece to study Theology. Afterwards, Pope Cyril V appointed him a Metropolitan.

Enthroning a Bishop as Pope
Before becoming a Pope, John XIX was the Metropolitan of Al Beheira in Egypt; he is the first ever Bishop/Metropolitan of an Eparchy to become a Pope in the history of the Coptic Orthodox Church; before him the tradition was to nominate a Monk to the Papal position 

Some argue that the choice of Bishop as Pope (and Bishop) of the City of Alexandria is not canonical (against Canon 15 of Nicea and other Church councils/canons).  This issue has caused an ongoing dispute since 1928 in the Coptic Orthodox Church.

References

John XIX of Alexandria
1855 births
1942 deaths
People from Asyut Governorate